B. Parthasarathy is an Indian politician and was a member of the 14th Tamil Nadu Legislative Assembly from the Virugambakkam Constituency in Chennai District. He represented the Desiya Murpokku Dravida Kazhagam party.

On 31 December 2015, Parthasarathy was arrested along with 17 others for an assault on journalists outside Vijayakanth's residence.

The elections of 2016 resulted in his constituency being won by Virugai V. N. Ravi.

References 

Tamil Nadu MLAs 2011–2016
Desiya Murpokku Dravida Kazhagam politicians
Living people
1965 births